Mirshad Kootapunna Michu (born 3 February 1994) is an Indian professional footballer who plays as a goalkeeper for Indian Super League club NorthEast United.

Career

East Bengal
While Playing in KPL for Gokulam Kerala, Mirshad was spotted by East Bengal scout Alvito D'Cunha and signed up for the
2017-18 season.
In East Bengal, He joined with other Kerala Players Ubaid CK, Suhair V P, Jobi Justin who were also part the squad.

NorthEast United
On 1 October 2021, NorthEast United confirmed the signing of Mirshad on its social media and various other platforms for the 2021–22 Indian Super League season. He made his debut for the club on 10 December, in their 0–1 defeat to Odisha. Mirshad kept his first clean-sheet on 17 December against the East Bengal in a 2–0 victory.

Career statistics

Honours
East Bengal
Calcutta Football League: 2017–18

References

1994 births
Living people
People from Kasaragod district
Indian footballers
Footballers from Kerala
I-League players
Association football goalkeepers
East Bengal Club players
Gokulam Kerala FC players
NorthEast United FC players
Indian Super League players